Lintott may refer to:

 Barnaby Bernard Lintot or Lintott, English publisher (1675–1736)
 Evelyn Lintott, English footballer (1883–1916)
 James Lintott, British Olympic athlete (1886–unknown)
 Andrew Lintott, British classical scholar (b. 1936)
 Graham Lintott, Chief of the Royal New Zealand Air Force (b. 1955)
Chris Lintott, English astrophysicist (b. 1980), for whom is named:
 4937 Lintott, a minor planet